GYD may refer to:

 Guyanese dollar, the currency of Guyana
 Heydar Aliyev International Airport, in Baku, Azerbaijan
 Kayardild language, spoken in Australia
 Global Youth Day, a spiritual/religious event
 Grab your Deal (also: GrabyourDeal, sometimes found with suffix "24" or purely Grab24), a trading brand for toys, child products, sports equipment, home decoration objects and garden accessories
 Get Yourself Dressed, a company that provides colorful party costumes via internet to end customers

See also
 GID (disambiguation)